Juan de Dios Aguayo Moreno (born 11 March 1997) is a Mexican professional footballer who plays as a defender for Liga de Expansión MX club Tapatío, on loan from Liga MX club Guadalajara.

International career
Aguayo was called up for the 2017 FIFA U-20 World Cup.

References

External links
 
 
 

1997 births
Living people
Mexican footballers
Association football defenders
Alebrijes de Oaxaca players
C.D. Guadalajara footballers
Liga MX players
Liga de Expansión MX players
Footballers from Guadalajara, Jalisco